Copper Wimmin were an American women-only vocal group. They formed in the late 1990s, and released three albums. They disbanded in 2006.

Their lyrics mainly deal with the topics of sexism, consumerism, the American way of life, and the empowerment of women – or "womyn", a spelling they often used and which is, like "wimmin", not unusual in feminist circles.

They were quite popular in the lesbian community, especially after one of their songs (Bleeding rivers) was featured in the episode "Lead, Follow or Get Out of the Way" of the TV series The L Word (Season 3, Episode 9), although the song was not included on the soundtrack album.

Discography
 American Tyranny (1998)
 Etheric Bodies
 The right to be here (2005; features "Bleeding Rivers")

American vocal groups
Lesbian feminism
American lesbian musicians
All-female bands
Musical groups disestablished in 2006
Professional a cappella groups